William Leigh (1550–1639) was an English clergyman and royal tutor.

William Leigh may also refer to:
William Leigh (MP), member of Parliament for Cumberland in 1399 and 1414
William Leigh (Dean of Hereford) (1752–1809), Anglican priest
 William Henry Leigh (merchant) (1781–1818), merchant and former colonial official in Sierra Leone
William Leigh (judge) (1783–1871), American jurist
 William Henry Leigh, 2nd Baron Leigh (1824–1905), British politician
 William Leigh, ship's surgeon, early settler and landowner at Clarendon, South Australia c.1846
William Robinson Leigh (1866–1955), American artist
William Colston Leigh Sr. (1901–1992), American businessman, created one of the world's leading speakers' agencies
William Gerard Leigh (1915–2008), member of the British Life Guards and major figure in the polo world

See also
William Lee (disambiguation)